

This is a list of Sites of Special Scientific Interest (SSSIs) in Lincolnshire. This list includes sites within the ceremonial county of Lincolnshire, covering the two unitary authorities North Lincolnshire and North East Lincolnshire as well as the rest of the county administered by Lincolnshire County Council.

This list features 98 SSSIs notable for their biology, 23 notable for their geology and three notable for both. Six of the SSSIs include national nature reserves, four are Ramsar Wetland sites, and five are EU Special Protection Areas.

For other counties, see List of SSSIs by Area of Search.

Sites

See also 

 List of SSSIs by Area of Search
 List of Ancient Woods in England
 Lincolnshire Wildlife Trust

References

External links 

Sites of Special Scientific Interest in Lincolnshire
Lincolnshire
Sites of Special
Geology of East Midlands